Paul Afeaki Khoury (born 27 April 1968) is a Tongan-Lebanese former professional basketball player of American descent. He played most of his career in Japan and Lebanon.

He was born in Tonga to American parents, and graduated from the University of Utah in 1992. He joined the Utah Jazz summer league camp in 1992.

He selected with the 9th overall selection in the 1992 CBA Draft.

Career
He played his first pro season in Turkey before heading to Japan (played for Saitama Broncos, Sumitomo Metal Sparks, Hamamatsu Higashimikawa Phoenix) for 5 years. In 2001, he signed a contract with the Lebanese team Al Ryadi and three years later he joined Sagesse. He was granted by a Lebanese passport by the government.

 1994-95  Fenerbahçe
 1995 Antalya Büyükşehir Belediyesi
 1996-01 in Japan
  Saitama Broncos
  Sumitomo Metal Sparks
  Hamamatsu Higashimikawa Phoenix
 2001-04  Al Ryadi
 2004-06  Sagesse

Lebanon National Team
With the Lebanon National Team, he played the 2002 FIBA World Championship in Indianapolis. The team didn't manage to win a single game and got the last rank after a 70-100 loss to Algeria in the classification game despite a 16 pts 9 rbs effort from him. During the tournament, he averaged 6.4 pts 56.5 %FG 6.0 rbs in 19 min per game including a 7 pts 10 rbs game against Turkey.

Lebanon secured the silver medal in the Asian Championship with a loss in the final game against Yao Ming's China and Paul was one of the best post player in the tournament.

References

External links
Player Profile @ asia-basket.com
TBLStat.net Profile

1968 births
Living people
Centers (basketball)
Lebanese men's basketball players
Lebanese people of American descent
Lebanese people of Tongan descent
American people of Tongan descent
American expatriate basketball people in Turkey
Fenerbahçe men's basketball players
Antalya Büyükşehir Belediyesi players
Saitama Broncos players
San-en NeoPhoenix players
Utah Utes men's basketball players
2002 FIBA World Championship players
American men's basketball players
Sagesse SC basketball players
Al Riyadi Club Beirut basketball players